Altnagelvin is a townland in County Londonderry, Northern Ireland. It is also the name of an electoral ward in Derry and Strabane district. Formerly a small village, it has been absorbed into the Waterside neighbourhood of Derry. Within Altnagelvin is Altnagelvin Area Hospital, a large hospital which serves the most of the county. 

The busy A6 road from Belfast to Derry passes through the townland.

Demographics
On Census Day 29 April 2001 the resident population of Altnagelvin ward was 4477. Of these:

 26.6% were under 16 years old and 11.0% were aged 60 and above 
 48.3% of the population were male and 51.7% were female 
 38.0% were from a Roman Catholic background and 59.7% were from a Protestant background 
 5.2% of those aged 16–74 were unemployed

References

Derry (city)
Wards of Northern Ireland
Townlands of County Londonderry
Derry and Strabane district